Acacia bartlei, commonly known as Bartle's wattle, is a shrub or tree of the genus Acacia and the subgenus Plurinerves. It is native to a small area along the south coast in the Goldfields-Esperance region of Western Australia.

Description
It has resin-ribbed branchlets. Like most species of Acacia it has phyllodes rather than true leaves. It blooms between June ad October.

Distribution
It has a limited distribution around Esperance where it is found a few scattered locations from around Salmon Gums and Scaddan in the west from around Mount Key, Mount Burdett and Kau Rock in the east. It is often situated in or around waterlogged depressions growing in clay-loam or sandy-loam soils as a part of woodland communities associated with Eucalyptus occidentalis.

See also
 List of Acacia species

References

bartlei
Acacias of Western Australia
Taxa named by Bruce Maslin
Plants described in 2012